Eivar Widlund (15 June 1905 – 31 March 1968) was a Swedish football goalkeeper who played for AIK. He also represented Team Sweden in the 1934 FIFA World Cup in Italy.

He was married to Maj Jacobsson, an international track and field athlete.

References

External links

1905 births
1968 deaths
Swedish footballers
Sweden international footballers
Association football goalkeepers
Örebro SK players
AIK Fotboll players
Allsvenskan players
1934 FIFA World Cup players
Sportspeople from Örebro